José Luis "Garrafa" Sánchez (May 26, 1974 – January 8, 2006) was an Argentine football midfielder. He played mostly for Deportivo Laferrere and Banfield, and is considered an idol for both of these clubs' fans. His nickname, garrafa, means gas cylinder in Spanish.

Career

Sánchez started his career in 1993 (aged 19) playing for Laferrere against Almirante Brown in the Primera B Nacional (Argentine second division). He played as a left back, despite being regularly an attacking midfielder for the rest of his career. He scored his first professional goal against Colón in a 1–6 defeat. Sánchez could not help Laferrere avoid relegation and played one season with the team at the lower Primera B Metropolitana.

For the 1997-98 season he was transferred to El Porvenir, where he helped the team gain promotion to the Primera B Nacional. Subsequently, he had a brief spell at Uruguayan Bella Vista during the 1999–2000 season.

His next promotion would be achieved playing for Banfield in the 2000-01 season, when he helped the team reach the Argentine Primera División. Garrafa stayed in Banfield until 2005, playing the 2004 Copa Sudamericana and 2005 Copa Libertadores with the club and being part of the Primera División runner-up team of the 2005 Clausura. He returned to Laferrere in 2005, where he played until his death.

Playing style

Sánchez was a classic style offensive midfielder (or enganche in Argentine terms), with great technique and precise shooting. His talent however was intermittent . Although there were rumours about Sanchez dislike of training, these are false, he was among the first to show up for training, always riding his motorcycle.

Death

Sánchez died on January 8, 2006, as a consequence of injuries sustained while driving his motorcycle. The police report informed that he suffered the accident after attempting a wheelie, a classic bike trick.

Honours

El Porvenir
Primera B Metropolitana (1): 1997 Apertura

Banfield
Primera B Nacional (1): 2000-01

References

External links

 Argentine Primera statistics at Fútbol XXI  
 Career statistics at BDFA 

1974 births
2006 deaths
Argentine footballers
Club Atlético Banfield footballers
C.A. Bella Vista players
Argentine Primera División players
Expatriate footballers in Uruguay
Association football midfielders
Road incident deaths in Argentina
Footballers from Buenos Aires